Johannes Joseph "Jon" van Rood (7 April 1926, Scheveningen – 21 July 2017) was a Dutch immunologist. He founded Eurotransplant in 1967, a non-profit organization responsible for encouraging and coordinating organ transplants.

Awards
In 1977 van Rood was awarded the Robert Koch Prize. In 1978, he was awarded the Wolf Prize in Medicine, jointly with George D. Snell and Jean Dausset, "for his contribution to the understanding of the complexity of the HLA system in man and its implications in transplantation and in disease." Van Rood was elected a member of the Royal Netherlands Academy of Arts and Sciences in 1978. In 1989 he was awarded the Ernst Jung Prize for Medicine.

Death
He died on 21 July 2017 in Leeuwarden.

Publications (sel.)
 Johannes Joseph van Rood: Leucocyte grouping. Den Haag, 1962 (Dissertation Leiden University)

References

External links
  Profile at KNAW
Geoff Watts Obituary Johannes Joseph van Rood The Lancet, 11 November 2017, DOI: https://dx.doi.org/10.1016/S0140-6736(17)32739-3

1926 births
2017 deaths
Dutch immunologists
Leiden University alumni
Academic staff of Leiden University
Physicians from The Hague
Fellows of the Royal College of Pathologists
Commanders of the Order of Orange-Nassau
Knights of the Order of the Netherlands Lion
Members of the Royal Netherlands Academy of Arts and Sciences
Wolf Prize in Medicine laureates
Foreign associates of the National Academy of Sciences